Gantin is a surname. Notable  people with this surname include:

 Bernardin Gantin (1922–2008), Beninese cardinal of the Roman Catholic Church
 Camih Epiphanie Gantin,  a beauty pageant titleholder who was crowned Miss Togo 2012

See also 
 Gand (disambiguation)
 Gant (surname)